NVC community SD11 (Carex arenaria - Cornicularia aculeata dune community) is one of the 16 sand-dune communities in the British National Vegetation Classification system.

It is one of four communities associated with fixed dunes.

It is a comparatively localised community. There are two subcommunities.

Community composition

The following constant species are found in this community:
 Sand sedge (Carex arenaria)
 the lichen Cornicularia aculeata

The following rare species are also associated with the community:
 Purple Milk-vetch (Astragalus danicus)
 Grey Hair-grass (Corynephorus canescens)

Distribution

This community is found on the east coast, mostly on the sand-dunes of Norfolk and Suffolk, but also in Aberdeenshire and on the south coast of Kent. It is also found inland, in The Brecks on the Norfolk/Suffolk border.

Subcommunities

There are two subcommunities:
 the Ammophila arenaria subcommunity
 the Festuca ovina subcommunity

References

 Rodwell, J. S. (2000) British Plant Communities Volume 5 - Maritime communities and vegetation of open habitats  (hardback),  (paperback)

SD11